Paradise Garden is a lost 1917 American silent comedy romance film starring Harold Lockwood and directed by Fred J. Balshofer. The film is based on a novel, Paradise Garden, by George Gibbs and has a feature role for Virginia Rappe, who would soon be more famous for her death under mysterious circumstances that were sensationalized by the media. Metro Pictures distributed the film.

Cast
Harold Lockwood - Jerry Benham
Vera Sisson - Una Habberton
Virginia Rappe - Marcia Van Wyck
William Clifford - Roger Canby
Lester Cuneo - Jack Ballard
G. Sprotte - Henry Ballard
Catherine Henry - Miss Gore
George Hupp - Jerry Benham, as child (credited as Little George Hupp)
Olive Bruce - (undetermined role)
Harry DeRoy - (undetermined role)

Reception
Like many American films of the time, Paradise Garden was subject to cuts by city and state film censorship boards. The Chicago Board of Censors required cuts of two scenes of a couple standing before a nude painting in background and of the closeup of the girl's back after her gown was torn from her shoulder.

References

External links

1917 films
American silent feature films
Films directed by Fred J. Balshofer
Films based on American novels
Lost American films
American black-and-white films
1917 romantic comedy films
American romantic comedy films
Metro Pictures films
Censored films
1910s American films
Silent romantic comedy films
Silent American comedy films
Lost romantic comedy films
1910s English-language films